Tafalla is a town and municipality located in the province and  autonomous community of Navarre, northern Spain. The Postal code is 31300.

Tafalla is an industrial and agricultural town. It produces beef, mutton, pork and chicken.

History

Prehistory 
There are traces of human presence in the area dating from the Chalcolithic age. A study carried out in 1998 has shown the human presence in the municipality during the Chalcolithic (Eneolithic), approximately between 4,500 and 3,700 years ago. These settlements must have been temporary. Until the Iron Age (900-300 BC) there are no remains of stable settlements in the area. Of the eight settlements that should have taken place in the area, Valmediano stands out, which must have been an authentic fortified settlement or that of Romerales, in which a continuity of settlement is revealed up to Roman times.

Old Age 
In Roman times 15 settlements had to be established in the area. These were concentrated in the flatter areas near the Cidacos River in places such as El Busquil, La Pedrera, La Recueja, Los Cascajos and El Escal. In the place of the Lobera a funeral tombstone was found, where the name of Thurscando appeared. This tombstone is in the House of Culture of Tafalla.

Middle Ages 
The first historical mention of Tafalla dates from the tenth century when it was named in the Chronicle of Arib Ibn Said, which recounts a raid on Tafalla by Abd al-Rahman III during a campaign against the Kingdom of Pamplona, in the year 924. The town was located in the Basque region. In the year 1043 after the victory of King García III de Nájera with the help of the Tafallese against Ramiro I of Aragón and allied Arabs, the Tafallese were granted the title of Noble, Loyal and Strong. The battle took place in the field of Barranquiel. Immediately following this victory there is mention of the Pilgrimage to the Shrine of the Virgin of Ujué. Sancho Ramírez granted Tafalla its first charter, which was later confirmed by Sancho the Wise in 1157 and Theobald II (in 1255). Sancho VII the Strong granted another charter to the Tafallese, freeing them of all taxes and real service, by means of stipulated census.

Carlos III the Noble granted the privilege to keep holiday in the year 1418, and in 1423 he granted them a seat in the Cortes, among the "Good Towns," and exempting the Tafallese from all servitude, while declaring them free men. In the Civil War of Navarre, Tafalla sided with the Beaumont confederacy, defending the rights of Carlos Prince of Viana, although after the Castilian-Aragonese invasion it defended the legitimate kings of Navarre against the invaders.

Modern and Contemporary Age 

Felipe IV granted to Tafalla the title of city with seat in Courts in the year 1636. During the War of Independence the city was an important strategic place due to its proximity to Pamplona and was occupied by the French in 1808, turning it into a barracks. Cruchaga in 1811 and finally Espoz y Mina in 1811 and 1812 penetrated the city. In a bombing carried out by the latter, the convent of San Francisco and the Castle-Palace built in the fifteenth century by order of Charles III the Noble were destroyed., as residence of the Navarrese kings. The remains that were left were demolished to build the current Plaza de Navarra in 1856. That same strategic importance also had Tafalla during the Carlist Wars.

Tafalla was declared head of the Judicial Party by the Cortes of Navarre in 1836. Tafalla suffered major floods in 1833 when the Congosto dam was broken and in 1886, with significant losses.

In the last two thirds of the century the necessary steps were taken to provide the city with modern urban services, such as the installation of public lighting with oil lanterns (1843), the serenos (1846) were established, the Plaza de Navarra (1856), the railway that connects Pamplona and the Ebro (1860), the telegraph (1862) was inaugurated, the bridge was opened in 1866 to link the station and the city on the Zidacos river and the light was installed years later electrical (1895). Between the last years of the 19th century and the first of the twentieth century had opened the Spanish Casino (1922), the Gorriti Theater (1909), which was closed in 1986, bus lines had been organized and two schools had been established, the College of PP Piarists (1883) and the San José School of the Daughters of the Cross (1888).

Jurist Florencio García Goyena was born in this town in 1783 and Antonio Azarola y Gresillón, rear admiral of the Spanish Republican Navy was born in Tafalla in 1874.

Notable people 

 Ion Vélez, footballer
 Aitor Buñuel, footballer
 Uxúa López (born 1983), engineer, activist
 Carlos Solchaga, politician

Local celebrations 
 20 January, Saint Sebastian.

References

External links

Ayuntamiento de Tafalla
 TAFALLA in the Bernardo Estornés Lasa - Auñamendi Encyclopedia (Euskomedia Fundazioa) 

Municipalities in Navarre